Tin Wing is an MTR Light Rail stop. It is located at ground level beside Tin Shing Road in Tin Shui Wai Town Centre, Yuen Long District. It began service on 26 March 1995 and belongs to Zone 4.

History
The stop was originally named Tin Shui Wai Terminus. To avoid confusion with the new Tin Shui Wai station on the KCRC West Rail (now part of the MTR Tuen Ma line), which has a light rail station of the same name, its name was changed to Tin Wing. The change came into effect on 1 August 2003.

On 7 December 2003, two extensions of the light rail network in Tin Shui Wai came into service, namely the Tin Shui Wai Phase 4 Extension and Tin Shui Wai Reserve Zone Extension, two weeks before the opening of the new West Rail commuter line. This transformed Tin Wing from the terminus of the line into an intermediate station. At the same time, the 720 (Tin Wing–Yau Oi) and 721 (Tin Wing–Yuen Long Terminus) routes were replaced with routes 751 (Tin Yat–Yau Oi) and 761 (Tin Wing–Yuen Long), respectively. 

Route 761 was discontinued on 8 October 2006. In other words, there is no longer a direct service from Tin Wing stop to Yuen Long.

Property development
The Kowloon-Canton Railway Corporation (KCR) successfully applied to the Town Planning Board to allow a property development above the then-Tin Shui Wai Terminus. When the MTR Corporation (MTRC) and Kowloon-Canton Railway Corporation merged their operations in 2007, the MTRC purchased various KCR property development rights, including the Tin Wing project. The original plans included four 43-storey blocks with 1,600 flats.

In February 2015, the MTR Corporation signed an agreement with developer Sun Hung Kai Properties to jointly develop the site as a three-tower development with 1,930 flats and a commercial element. Tin Wing stop was reconfigured as a conventional side platform station along Tin Shing Road, and the other platforms as well as the loop tracks were demolished to make way for the construction project, which is expected to be completed in 2024.

Light rail drivers were apparently told by MTRC management to slow down upon approaching the stop without being informed why. The corporation was criticised by some legislators, including Roy Kwong of the Democratic Party, for not having previously publicly disclosed that the incident had happened.

According to the Hong Kong government, the situation was examined by the Buildings Department (BD) and Electrical and Mechanical Services Department (EMSD). The Buildings Department subsequently agreed to raise the acceptable subsidence limit from 80 to 150 mm. In May 2019, the government gave the go-ahead for construction work to resume. The government stated that BD, EMSD, and MTRC would continue to monitor the situation closely to ensure the safety of railway operations.

References

1995 establishments in Hong Kong
MTR Light Rail stops
Former Kowloon–Canton Railway stations
Tin Shui Wai
Railway stations in Hong Kong opened in 1995